Little Witchingham is a village and civil parish in the English county of Norfolk.
For the purposes of local government, it falls within the district of Broadland.

St Faith's Church (right) is now redundant.

See also
St Faith's Church, Little Witchingham

References

Sources

External links

Broadland
Villages in Norfolk
Civil parishes in Norfolk